Undertow is the second album by Blind Idiot God, released in 1989 through Enemy Records.

Accolades

Track listing

Personnel 
Adapted from the Undertow liner notes.

Blind Idiot God
Ted Epstein – drums
Andy Hawkins – guitar
Gabriel Katz – bass guitar

Production and additional personnel
Martin Bisi – mixing, recording
Bill Laswell – production
Howie Weinberg – mastering
John Zorn – alto saxophone and production (11)

Release history

References

External links 
 

1988 albums
Blind Idiot God albums
Albums produced by Bill Laswell
Enemy Records albums